M. M. Naidu (28 October 1911 – 13 December 1991) was an Indian cricket umpire. He stood in one Test match, India vs. England, in 1951.

See also
 List of Test cricket umpires
 English cricket team in India in 1951–52

References

1911 births
1991 deaths
Place of birth missing
Indian Test cricket umpires